Misaki Emura (born 20 November 1998) is a Japanese fencer. She won the gold medal in the women's sabre event at the 2022 World Fencing Championships held in Cairo, Egypt. She won the silver medal in both the women's individual and team sabre events at the 2022 Asian Fencing Championships held in Seoul, South Korea.

In 2014, she won the gold medal in the mixed team event at the Summer Youth Olympics held in Nanjing, China. A month later, she competed in the women's individual sabre and women's team sabre events at the 2014 Asian Games held in Incheon, South Korea. In 2017, she competed in the women's sabre event at the World Fencing Championships held in Leipzig, Germany. She won one of the bronze medals in the women's individual sabre event at the 2017 Summer Universiade held in Taipei, Taiwan. She also won the gold medal in the women's team sabre event.

In 2021, she competed in the women's sabre event at the 2020 Summer Olympics held in Tokyo, Japan. She also competed in the women's team sabre event.

References

External links 
 

Living people
1998 births
People from Ōita Prefecture
Japanese female sabre fencers
Sportspeople from Ōita Prefecture
Fencers at the 2014 Summer Youth Olympics
Asian Games competitors for Japan
Fencers at the 2014 Asian Games
Universiade medalists in fencing
Universiade gold medalists for Japan
Universiade bronze medalists for Japan
Medalists at the 2017 Summer Universiade
Fencers at the 2020 Summer Olympics
Olympic fencers of Japan
World Fencing Championships medalists
21st-century Japanese women